Schön is a German surname, which means handsome or beautiful, from the Middle High German schoene, meaning "beautiful", "friendly", "nice".
Schon means "already" and "yet".
Alternative spellings include Schon and Schoen.

The name may refer to:
Adolf Schön (1906–1987), German cyclist
Alfred Schön (born 1962), German football player and manager
Andreas Schön (born 1989), German footballer
Donald Schön (1930–1997), American philosopher
Douglas Schoen (born 1953), American political analyst
Ebbe Schön (born 1929), Swedish writer
Eduard Schön (1825–1879), Austrian composer
Helmut Schön (1915–1996), German footballer
Jan Hendrik Schön (born 1970), German physicist 
John W. Schoen (born 1952), American journalist 
Jonas Schön (born 1969), Swedish ice speed skater
Kevin Schon (born 1958), American actor
Margarete Schön (1895–1985), German actress
Mila Schön (1917–2008), Italian fashion designer
Nadine Schön (born 1983), German politician
Nancy Schön (born 1928), American sculptor
Neal Schon (born 1954), American musician
Richard Schoen (born 1950), American mathematician
Theodor von Schön (1773–1856), Prussian politician
Vic Schoen (1916–2000), American musician
Wilhelm von Schoen (1851–1933), German diplomat

See also

 Schön (disambiguation)
 Schoen
Surnames from nicknames

References

German-language surnames